Maḥmūd al-Ḥasan ibn Ghalim ad-Dīn Aḥmad al-Muʾminshāhawī (born 5 July 1950), or simply Mahmudul Hasan, is a Bangladeshi Deobandi Islamic scholar, writer, religious reformer, educator, public speaker and spiritual figure. He is the president of Al-Haiatul Ulya Lil-Jamiatil Qawmia Bangladesh and Befaqul Madarisil Arabia Bangladesh, chancellor of Jamia Islamia Darul Uloom Madania, Khatib at Gulshan Central Jama Masjid, editor in chief of Monthly Al-Jamia and Amir of Majlis-e Dawatul Haq Bangladesh. He is the author of Tafsirul Burhanul Quran.

Name and lineage
Mahmudul Hasan was born on 5 July 1950, to a Bengali Muslim family in the village of Charkharicha under Kotwali Thana in Mymensingh District . His father's name is Galimuddin Ahmed and mother's name is Fatema Ramzani.

Career
Currently he is Khatib at Gulshan Central Azad Mosque and Eidgah Society, Amir of Majlish-e-Dawatul Haque Bangladesh .

On 3 October 2020, he is elected president of Befaqul Madarisil Arabia Bangladesh, the largest education board of Qawmi Madrasah . According to law, he is the president of Al-Haiatul Ulya Lil-Jamiatil Qawmia Bangladesh, the highest education board of Qawmi Madrasah.

Publications
He has published books in Arabic, Bengali and Urdu.
His books include:
Tafsirul Burhanul Quran
Al Imam Abu Yusuf: Muhaddisan wa Faqihan
Ar Raddul Jamil
Dawatul Haq and Dawat-e-Tabligh
Islamic state thought
Love for the Prophet's family
Hayate Abrar
Hayate Usmani
Al Burhanul Muayyad
Tohfaye Abrar
Tohfaye Sunnah
Adarsa Motobad
Mawaeze Hasanah
Search for Siratul Mustakim

See more
 Fazlul Hoque Amini
 Junaid Babunagari
 Muhiuddin Khan

Bibliography

References

External links

1950 births
Bangladeshi Islamic religious leaders
Bangladeshi Sunni Muslim scholars of Islam
Bengali Muslim scholars of Islam
Deobandis
Hanafis
Living people
Jamia Uloom-ul-Islamia alumni
People from Mymensingh District
Sunni Muslim scholars of Islam
20th-century Muslim scholars of Islam
20th-century Bengalis
21st-century Bengalis